Shucky Ducky is the stage name of comedian Cecil Armstrong (born 1956), a native of Dallas, Texas. He has appeared on "Def Comedy Jam". He has also been the ringmaster of the UniverSoul Circus. He is known for the catchphrase "Shucky Ducky Quack Quack."

He describes his catchphrase as meaning disappointment or excitement. As he explained it at an Elan Productions event,

In popular culture
2012 Republican Presidential hopeful Herman Cain used the phrase during the announcement of his candidacy in May 2011.
He was parodied on Saturday Night Live by Bobby Moynihan as "Slappy Pappy," with the catchphrase "Slappy Pappy Wink Wink!"
Fellow Texan, and commentator on WWE Raw, Booker T uses Armstrong's catchphrase to pick his favorite moment or match of the night.

References

External links

21st-century American comedians
Living people
1956 births
People from Dallas